Alec Gardiner (born 3 January 1935) was an Australian rules footballer who played with Footscray in the Victorian Football League (VFL). His father, also named Alec was a Footscray player during the 1920s.

Gardiner, originally from Gisborne, was one of Footscray's wingers in the 1961 VFL Grand Final loss to Hawthorn. From 1963 to 1967, Gardiner was captain-coach of Box Hill in the Victorian Football Association (VFA). He always polled well in the Field Trophy, finishing as the runner-up in 1964.  In all, Gardiner played a total of 73 games for Box Hill, mainly as a centreman, and scored 61 goals.  In 2000 he was selected on the wing in Box Hill's "Greatest Ever Team" and named as captain.

References

Holmesby, Russell and Main, Jim (2007). The Encyclopedia of AFL Footballers. 7th ed. Melbourne: Bas Publishing.

1935 births
Australian rules footballers from Victoria (Australia)
Western Bulldogs players
Box Hill Football Club players
Box Hill Football Club coaches
Gisborne Football Club players
Living people